Camille Félix Michel Rousset (15 February 1821, Paris – 19 February 1892,  Saint-Gobain) was a French historian. He taught at Grenoble before becoming a historian to the Ministry of War. He was elected to the Académie française in 1871.

Bibliography
Précis d'histoire de la Révolution et de l'Empire (1849)
Histoire de Louvois (4 vol.) (1861–63)
Correspondance de Louis XV et du maréchal de Noailles (2 vol.) (1865)
Le Comte de Gisors (1868)
Les Volontaires de 1791-1794 (1870)
La Grande Armée de 1813 (1871)
Histoire de la guerre de Crimée (1877)
La Conquête d'Alger (1879)
Un ministre de la Restauration : le marquis de Clermont-Tonnerre (1883)
L'Algérie de 1830 à 1840 (2 vol.) (1887)
La conquête de l'Algérie, 1841 à 1857 (2 vol.) (1889)

External links 
Académie française
 Livre à télécharger : La conquête d'Alger Camille-Félix-Michel Rousset - Éditions Plon et Cie - 1879 - 291 pages

1821 births
1892 deaths
French military historians
19th-century French historians
Members of the Académie Française
French male non-fiction writers
19th-century French male writers